Westwood is a neighborhood in Seattle, Washington, United States. It is located in the southwest of the city, close to the neighboring CDP of White Center. Westwood is known for its International Baccalaureate high school, Chief Sealth High.

Location 
The area is so named because of the huge copses of elm and maple trees in the area, especially along Elmgrove between 35th and 27th. The neighborhood is bounded by Roxhill and Arbor Heights to the south, Highpoint to the north, Delridge to the east and 35th Avenue to the west (including Fauntleroy and Gatewood).

Civic services and issues 

King County Metro bus routes link Westwood, Delridge, and Thistle with the rest of Seattle.

A popular blog tracks housing development and civic activities in the Westwood area.

Landmarks 
Landmarks include the Southwest Pool and Sports Complex, Westwood Village, and Chief Sealth High School. The school was designated an International high school in 2010 (with Denny Middle School receiving the same designation as a middle school). Its curriculum includes languages and multi-cultural education.

References

West Seattle, Seattle